The cashew tree (Anacardium occidentale) is a tropical evergreen tree native to South America in the genus Anacardium that produces the cashew seed and the cashew apple accessory fruit. The cashew seed is commonly considered a snack nut (cashew nut) eaten on its own, used in recipes, or processed into cashew cheese or cashew butter. Like the tree, the nut is often simply called a cashew. Cashew allergies are triggered by the proteins found in tree nuts, and cooking often does not remove or change these proteins.

In 2019, four million tonnes of cashew nuts were produced globally, with Ivory Coast and India as the leading producers. As well as the nut and fruit, the plant has several other uses. The shell of the cashew seed yields derivatives that can be used in many applications including lubricants, waterproofing, paints, and, starting in World War II, arms production. The cashew apple is a light reddish to yellow fruit, whose pulp and juice can be processed into a sweet, astringent fruit drink or fermented and distilled into liquor.

Description

The fruit of the cashew tree is an accessory fruit (sometimes called a pseudocarp or false fruit). What appears to be the fruit is an oval or pear-shaped structure, a hypocarpium, that develops from the pedicel and the receptacle of the cashew flower.

The true fruit of the cashew tree is a kidney– or boxing-glove–shaped drupe that grows at the end of the cashew apple. The drupe first develops on the tree and then the pedicel expands to become the cashew apple. The drupe becomes the true fruit, a single shell-encased seed, which is often considered a nut in the culinary sense. The seed is surrounded by a double shell that contains an allergenic phenolic resin, anacardic acid—which is a potent skin irritant chemically related to the better-known and also toxic allergenic oil urushiol, which is found in the related poison ivy and lacquer tree.

Etymology

The generic name Anacardium is composed of the Greek prefix ana-, the Greek cardia, and the New Latin suffix . It possibly refers to the heart shape of the fruit, to "the top of the fruit stem" or to the seed.  The word anacardium was earlier used to refer to Semecarpus anacardium (the marking nut tree) before Carl Linnaeus transferred it to the cashew; both plants are in the same family. The epithet occidentale derives from the Western (or Occidental) world.

Distribution and habitat 
The species is native to Northeastern Brazil and Southeastern Venezuela, and later was distributed around the world in the 1500s by Portuguese  explorers. Portuguese colonists in Brazil began exporting cashew nuts as early as the 1550s. The Portuguese took it to Goa, India between 1560 and 1565. From there, it spread throughout Southeast Asia and eventually Africa.

Cultivation
In 2014, rapid growth of cashew cultivation in Ivory Coast made this country the top African exporter. Fluctuations in world market prices, poor working conditions, and low pay for local harvesting have caused discontent in the cashew nut industry.

The cashew tree is cultivated in the tropics between 25°N and 25°S, and is well-adapted to hot lowland areas with a pronounced dry season, where the mango and tamarind trees also thrive. The traditional cashew tree is tall (up to 14 m) and takes three years from planting before it starts production, and eight years before economic harvests can begin. More recent breeds, such as the dwarf cashew trees, are up to 6 m tall, and start producing after the first year, with economic yields after three years. The cashew nut yields for the traditional tree are about 0.25 metric tons per hectare, in contrast to over a ton per hectare for the dwarf variety. Grafting and other modern tree management technologies are used to further improve and sustain cashew nut yields in commercial orchards.

Production
In 2020, global production of cashew nuts (as the kernel) was 4,180,990 tonnes, led by Ivory Coast and India with a combined 39% of the world total (table). Vietnam, Burundi, and the Philippines also had significant production. Vietnam was the largest processor of cashew globally in 2020.

Trade 
The top ten exporters of cashew nuts (in-shell; HS Code 080131) in value (USD) in 2021 were Ghana, Tanzania, Guinea-Bissau, Nigeria, Ivory Coast, Burkina Faso, Senegal, Indonesia, United Arab Emirates (UAE), and Guinea.

From 2017 to 2021, the top ten exporters of cashew nuts (shelled; HS Code 080132) were Vietnam, India, the Netherlands, Germany, Brazil, Ivory Coast, Nigeria, Indonesia, Burkina Faso, and the United States.

Toxicity
Some people are allergic to cashews, but they are a less frequent allergen than tree nuts or peanuts. For up to 6% of children and 3% of adults, consuming cashews may cause allergic reactions, ranging from mild discomfort to life-threatening anaphylaxis. These allergies are triggered by the proteins found in tree nuts, and cooking often does not remove or change these proteins. Reactions to cashew and tree nuts can also occur as a consequence of hidden nut ingredients or traces of nuts that may inadvertently be introduced during food processing, handling, or manufacturing. The shell of the cashew nut contains oil compounds that can cause contact dermatitis similar to poison ivy, primarily resulting from the phenolic lipids, anacardic acid, and cardanol. Due to the possible dermatitis, cashews are typically not sold in the shell to consumers. Readily and inexpensively extracted from the waste shells, cardanol is under research for its potential applications in nanomaterials and biotechnology.

Uses

Nutrition 

Raw cashews are 5% water, 30% carbohydrates, 44% fat, and 18% protein (table). In a 100-gram reference amount, raw cashews provide 553 kilocalories, 67% of the Daily Value (DV) in total fats, 36% DV of protein, 13% DV of dietary fiber and 11% DV of carbohydrates. Cashews are rich sources (20% or more of the DV) of dietary minerals, including particularly copper, manganese, phosphorus, and magnesium (79–110% DV), and of thiamin, vitamin B6 and vitamin K (32–37% DV). Iron, potassium, zinc, and selenium are present in significant content (14–61% DV) (table). Cashews (100 g, raw) contain  of beta-sitosterol.

Nut and shell 

Culinary uses for cashew seeds in snacking and cooking are similar to those for all tree seeds called nuts.

Cashews are commonly used in South Asian cuisine, whole for garnishing sweets or curries, or ground into a paste that forms a base of sauces for curries (e.g., korma), or some sweets (e.g., kaju barfi). It is also used in powdered form in the preparation of several Indian sweets and desserts. In Goan cuisine, both roasted and raw kernels are used whole for making curries and sweets. Cashews are also used in Thai and Chinese cuisines, generally in whole form. In the Philippines, cashew is a known product of Antipolo, and is eaten with suman. The province of Pampanga also has a sweet dessert called turrones de casuy, which is cashew marzipan wrapped in white wafers. In Indonesia, roasted and salted cashews are called kacang mete or kacang mede, while the cashew apple is called jambu monyet ( ‘monkey rose apple’).

In the 21st century, cashew cultivation increased in several African countries to meet the demands for manufacturing cashew milk, a plant milk alternative to dairy milk. In Mozambique, bolo polana is a cake prepared using powdered cashews and mashed potatoes as the main ingredients. This dessert is popular in South Africa.

Apple 

The mature cashew apple can be eaten fresh, cooked in curries, or fermented into vinegar, citric acid or an alcoholic drink. It is also used to make preserves, chutneys and jams in some countries such as India and Brazil. In many countries, particularly within South America, the cashew apple is used to flavor drinks, both alcoholic and nonalcoholic.

In Brazil, cashew fruit juice and the fruit pulp are used in the production of sweets, juice, mixed with alcoholic beverages such as cachaça, and as a flour, milk, or cheese. In Panama, the cashew fruit is cooked with water and sugar for a prolonged time to make a sweet, brown, paste-like dessert called  ( being a Spanish name for cashew).

Cashew nuts are more widely traded than cashew apples, because the fruit, unlike the nut, is easily bruised and has a very limited shelf life. Cashew apple juice, however, may be used for manufacturing blended juices.

When consumed, the apple's astringency is sometimes removed by steaming the fruit for five minutes before washing it in cold water. Steeping the fruit in boiling salt water for five minutes also reduces the astringency.

In Cambodia, where the plant is usually grown as an ornamental rather than an economic tree, the fruit is a delicacy and is eaten with salt.

Alcohol
In the Indian state of Goa, the ripened cashew apples are mashed and the juice is extracted and kept for fermentation for a few days which is called Neero. Fermented juice then undergoes a double distillation process. The resulting beverage is called feni or fenny. Feni is about 40–42% alcohol (80–84 proof). The single-distilled version is called urrak, which is about 15% alcohol (30 proof). In Tanzania, the cashew apple (bibo in Swahili) is dried and reconstituted with water and fermented, then distilled to make a strong liquor called gongo.

Nut oil 
Cashew nut oil is a dark yellow oil derived from pressing the cashew nuts (typically from lower value broken chunks created accidentally during processing), and is used for cooking or as a salad dressing. The highest quality oil is produced from a single cold pressing.

Shell oil 

Cashew nutshell liquid (CNSL) or cashew shell oil (CAS registry number 8007-24-7) is a natural resin with a yellowish sheen found in the honeycomb structure of the cashew nutshell, and is a byproduct of processing cashew nuts. It should not be confused with the edible cashew nut oil, as it is a strong irritant. It is therefore a danger in small-scale processing of the shells, but is a raw material having multiple possible uses. It is used in tropical folk medicine and for anti-termite treatment of timber.  Its composition varies depending on how it is processed.
 Cold, solvent-extracted CNSL is mostly composed of anacardic acids (70%), cardol (18%) and cardanol (5%).
 Heating CNSL decarboxylates the anacardic acids, producing a technical grade of CNSL that is rich in cardanol. Distillation of this material gives distilled, technical CNSL containing 78% cardanol and 8% cardol (cardol has one more hydroxyl group than cardanol). This process also reduces the degree of thermal polymerization of the unsaturated alkyl-phenols present in CNSL.
 Anacardic acid is also used in the chemical industry for the production of cardanol, which is used for resins, coatings, and frictional materials.

These substances are skin allergens, like lacquer and the oils of poison ivy, and they present a danger during manual cashew processing.

This natural oil phenol has interesting chemical structural features that can be modified to create a wide spectrum of biobased monomers. These capitalize on the chemically versatile construct, which contains three functional groups: the aromatic ring, the hydroxyl group, and the double bonds in the flanking alkyl chain. These include polyols, which have recently seen increased demand for their biobased origin and key chemical attributes such as high reactivity, range of functionalities, reduction in blowing agents, and naturally occurring fire retardant properties in the field of rigid polyurethanes, aided by their inherent phenolic structure and larger number of reactive units per unit mass.

CNSL may be used as a resin for carbon composite products.  CNSL-based Novolac is another versatile industrial monomer deriving from cardanol typically used as a reticulating agent for epoxy matrices in composite applications providing good thermal and mechanical properties to the final composite material.

Animal feed 
Discarded cashew nuts unfit for human consumption, alongside the residues of oil extraction from cashew kernels, can be used to feed livestock. Animals can also eat the leaves of cashew trees.

Other uses 
As well as the nut and fruit, the plant has several other uses. In Cambodia, the bark gives a yellow dye, the timber is used in boat-making, and for house-boards, and the wood makes excellent charcoal. The shells yield a black oil used as a preservative and water-proofing agent in varnishes, cements, and as a lubricant or timber seal. Timber is used to manufacture furniture, boats, packing crates, and charcoal. Its juice turns black on exposure to air, providing an indelible ink.

See also
 List of culinary nuts
 Semecarpus anacardium (the Oriental Anacardium), a native of India and closely related to the cashew

References

External links 
 

 
Anacardium
Crops originating from South America
Drupes
Edible nuts and seeds
Flora of South America
Fruit trees
Medicinal plants of South America
Nut oils
Plants described in 1753
Resins
Tropical agriculture